Unterland may refer to:

Unterland (electoral district), Liechtenstein
Tyrolean Unterland, Austria
Heldburger Unterland, Germany
South Tyrolean Unterland, Italy
Zürcher Unterland, Switzerland